Justin Hwang is an American restaurateur and politician from Oregon serving as the chair of the Oregon Republican Party since 2022. He is the first Asian American and Korean American to serve in the position. He previously served briefly as the vice chair from May to July of the same year. Hwang previously made unsuccessful bids for election to the Oregon House of Representatives and Oregon State Senate in 2018 and 2020, respectively.

Personal life and business career 
Hwang immigrated to the United States from South Korea as a child and obtained American citizenship in 2006. He is the founder of Joy Teriyaki, a restaurant chain in the Portland metropolitan area and owner of Fairview Food Plaza. Hwang has lived in east Multnomah County since 2003.

Oregon politics

Candidacies 
Hwang ran in both the 2018 Oregon House of Representatives election and the 2020 Oregon State Senate election, losing both times to state senator and former state representative Chris Gorsek. Hwang accused incumbent Gorsek as using anti-immigrant language in a mailer sent to voters in 2018.  In his 2020 state senate campaign, he was running to represent Oregon's 25th Senate district and focused on school funding for Mt. Hood Community College.

Oregon Republican Party 
Hwang became the chair of the Oregon Republican Party in July 2022 after briefly serving as the vice chair since May 2022. His incumbency was preceded by several resignations from positions within the state party, including state senator Dallas Heard and former state senator and Josephine County commissioner Herman Baertschiger, who resigned from the position in early 2022. As chair, Hwang has been critical of both Oregon governor Kate Brown and U.S. president Joe Biden regarding the 2021–2023 inflation surge.

References

External links 
Campaign website

Living people
1984 births
Oregon Republican Party chairs
Portland, Oregon Republicans
American politicians of Korean descent
South Korean emigrants to the United States
Candidates in the 2020 United States elections
Candidates in the 2018 United States elections
Asian conservatism in the United States